The Surianaceae are a family of plants in the order Fabales with five genera and eight known species. It has an unusual distribution: the genus Recchia is native to Mexico, and the sole member of Suriana, S. maritima, is a coastal plant with a pantropical distribution; and the remaining three genera are endemic to Australia.

They range in form from small shrubs to tall trees.

Systematics
Modern molecular phylogenetics suggest the following relationships:

Species

References 

 
Rosid families